Sacha Briquet (1930–2010) was a French actor, born in Neuilly-sur-Seine.

Biography
He notably played the character of Albert Travling in the children's television program L'Île aux enfants. He signed a book of memories, Comédien, pourquoi pas?, published by AJ in 1974.

Selected filmography

 Demain nous divorçons (1951)
 Under the Paris Sky (1951) - (uncredited)
 Le clochard milliardaire (1951)
 Le divertissement (1952)
 La Tour de Nesle (1955) - Un assassin (uncredited)
 Pas de pitié pour les caves (1955) - Gégène
 L'éveil de l'amour (1955)
 Marie Antoinette Queen of France (1956) - (uncredited)
 Printemps à Paris (1957) - Le pickpocket
 Sénéchal the Magnificent (1957) - Le représentant en télévision
 Mademoiselle et son gang (1957) - Émile - le serveur (uncredited)
 First of May (1958) - Un inspecteur en civil (uncredited)
 Miss Pigalle (1958)
 Archimède le clochard (1959) - Jean-Loup, l'Anglais / English Guest
 L'increvable (1959) - Minor Role (uncredited)
 Un témoin dans la ville (1959) - Le client du strip-tease éméché (uncredited)
 The Enigma of the Folies-Bergere (1959) - (uncredited)
 La marraine de Charley (1959) - Jacques
 Arrêtez le massacre (1959)
 Match contre la mort (1959)
 Les Bonnes Femmes (1960) - Henri
 The Gigolo (1960) - L'homme du bar / The Man in the Bar
 Wise Guys (1961) - Henri, le fiancé
 Amelie or The Time to Love (1961) - Hubert
 The Seven Deadly Sins (1961) - Harry (segment "Avarice, L'")
 The Elusive Corporal (1962) - L'évadé grimé en vielle femme
 Landru (1963) - Le substitut / Assistant prosecutor
 Ophélia (1963) - Gravedigger
 Thank You, Natercia (1963) - Jacques
 Clémentine chérie (1964) - L'animateur à la cérémonie des Miss
 The World's Most Beautiful Swindlers (1964) - (segment "L'homme qui vendit la Tour Eiffel")
 The Troops of St. Tropez (1964) - Le marchand de vêtements sur le port de Saint-Tropez (uncredited)
 Male Companion (1964) - Le fondé de pouvoir
 I Killed Rasputin (1967) - Tamarine
 Benjamin (1968) - Celestin
 L'écume des jours (1968)
 Ne jouez pas avec les Martiens (1968) - Méry
 Le concierge (1973) - Le vendeur de meubles
 Les confidences érotiques d'un lit trop accueillant (1973) - Robert, l'ami de Charles
 La gueule de l'emploi (1974) - L'homme important
 Gross Paris (1974)
 Le polygame (1974) - L'inspecteur
 Le portrait de Dorian Gray (1977) - Hamlet
 Le paradis des riches (1978) - Le commerçant
 Les surdoués de la première compagnie (1981)
 Carmen de Godard (1983) - (uncredited)
 Ave Maria (1984) - Le juge
 La vengeance du serpent à plumes (1984, directed by Gérard Oury) (with Coluche and Josiane Balasko) - Le concierge de l'hôtel
 Suivez mon regard (1986) - Le boulanger
 Hôtel du Paradis (1987) - Georges
 Funny Boy (1987) - Norman
 Un week-end sur deux (1990) - Albert, le maître d'hôtel
 Eye of the Widow (1991) - Cardinal
 The Accompanist (1992) - Dignitary
 Le roi de Paris (1995) - Roquépine
 Pédale douce (1996) - Emilio
 Belle maman (1999) - Agent immobilier
 Monsieur Naphtali (1999) - Directeur maison de repos
 Ma femme s'appelle Maurice (2002) - Le concierge de Georges
 Les irréductibles (2006) - Le maire
 Nous trois (2010) - Le grand-père (final film role)

See also
 L'Île aux enfants

External links 
 

1930 births
2010 deaths
People from Neuilly-sur-Seine
French male stage actors
French male film actors
French male television actors